The Ministries of the Argentine Republic, which form the cabinet, currently consist of sixteen ministries under a ministerial chief of staff. The ministers are appointed by and serve at the pleasure of the president. The current organization derives from the constitutional revision of 1994, and is governed by "The Law on Ministries".

History
Prior to independence, the administration of the Viceroyalty of the Río de la Plata was organized under the Royal Ordinance of Administrators issued 28 January 1782 (la Real Ordenanza de Intendentes), under which there were eight intendencias each with a governor reporting to the viceroy. The governor had the police, finance and the military under his direct control, and his lieutenant administered the courts. At first the revolutionaries retained the same system, only gradually dispersing the executive authority over a larger body of men. The first true cabinet posts in Argentina emerged in the early to mid-19th century first under the United Provinces of the Río de la Plata and later under the Argentine Confederation and the State of Buenos Aires. For example, the Department of Governance and War (Departamento de Gobierno y Guerra) was created on 28 May 1810 by the First Junta with Mariano Moreno as secretary, and although the First Junta sent out diplomates as early as 1810, it was not until 27 February 1813 that the Department of Foreign Business (Departamento de Negocios Extranjeros) was created under the supervision of the Secretary of State.

Argentine Confederation (1831 to 1852)
 Ministry of War and the Navy
 Ministry of Finance
 Ministry of Interior
 Ministry of Foreign Affairs
 Ministry of Justice, Religion and Public Education

State of Buenos Aires (1852 to 1861)
 Ministry of Governance 
 Ministry of War
 Ministry of Finance
 Ministry of Foreign Affairs
 Prosecutor's Office

Current ministries

Presidential secretariats with ministerial rank
The 1983 Law on Ministries passed by then-president Raúl Alfonsín set the precedent for secretariats of state with ministerial rank. These secretaries respond directly to the Presidency. As of the latest version of the Law on Ministries, these are the existing Secretariats of the Presidency counting with ministerial rank in the Argentine government.

Notes and references

 
Argentina, Ministries of
Government of Argentina